Pancha Bhoota Sthalam refers to five temples dedicated to Shiva, each representing a manifestation of the five prime elements of nature: earth, water, fire, air, and ether.  Pancha indicates "five," Bhoota means "elements," and Sthala means "place."  The temples are located in South India, four in Tamil Nadu and one in Andhra Pradesh. The five elements are believed to be enshrined in the five lingams of the temples, with each lingam named on the element represented. All five temples are located around the 78°E and 79°E longitudes and between 10°N and 14°N latitudes.

The presiding deities are revered in the 7th century Tamil Saiva canonical work, the Tevaram, written by Tamil saint poets known as the nayanars and classified as Paadal Petra Sthalam. The four temples in Tamil Nadu are maintained and administered by the Hindu Religious and Charitable Endowments Department of the Government of Tamil Nadu.

Pancha Bhootam
According to the Vedas, the material world is a combination of the five fundamental elements of nature namely earth, water, fire, air, and  ether.  Bhoota (Sanskrit:भूत) in Sanskrit means element and maha bhoota indicates a fundamental element.  According to Ayurveda, an ancient Indian medical system, the equilibrium of the body with the pancha bhoota is governed by the principles of tridoshas - kaph (phlegm), pitta (bile), vayu (gas), dhātu and malas (waste products). Rabindranath Tagore, in his book Pancha bhoota, has explained the emotional faculty of the human mind is keenly sensitive to all objects of light, colour, sound, effect of speed, sun, moon and stars.

The five temples
In Tiruvannamalai temple, Shiva is said to have manifested himself in the form of a massive column of fire.  A celebration of this manifestation is seen even today in the age old traditions observed during the festivals of Sivarathri and Karthigai Deepam. The Agni Lingam explains the mythics of life - duty, virtue, self-sacrifice and finally liberation by and through ascetic life at the end of Agni kalpa. The presiding deities are revered in the 7th century Tamil Saiva canonical work, the Tevaram, written by Tamil saint poets known as the nayanars and classified as Paadal Petra Sthalam. The four temples in Tamil Nadu are maintained and administered by the Hindu Religious and Charitable Endowments Department of the Government of Tamil Nadu.

Notes

References

.

.
.
.

.
.
.

External links
Imagemap:https://goo.gl/maps/BuCyXP7wCY32